The Spy (German: Der Spion) is a 1917 German silent war espionage film directed by Karl Heiland and starring Ferdinand Bonn, Ellen Richter and Conrad Veidt. It was made as a propaganda film to support the German war effort during the First World War. It is now considered a lost film.

It was shot around Cologne and Düsseldorf.

Synopsis
An Italian spy enters the German Empire in an attempt to commit sabotage and steal secret documents from a large armaments factory.

Cast
 Ferdinand Bonn as Anzio, der Spion
 Ellen Richter as Gräfin Fonsecca
 Leontine Kühnberg as Else Bohl
 Conrad Veidt as Steinau
 Bruno Lopinski as Besitzer der Rüstungsfabrik

References

Bibliography
 John T. Soister. Conrad Veidt on Screen: A Comprehensive Illustrated Filmography. McFarland, 2002.

External links

1917 films
Films of the German Empire
German silent feature films
Films directed by Karl Heiland
German black-and-white films
1910s spy films
German spy films
World War I spy films
Lost German films
1917 lost films
Silent war films
1910s German films
1910s German-language films